Kalinarayanpur Junction railway station is part of the Kolkata Suburban Railway system and operated by Eastern Railway. It is located on the Ranaghat–Krishnanagar line in Nadia in the Indian state of West Bengal.

References 

Sealdah railway division
Railway stations in Nadia district
Kolkata Suburban Railway stations